Bryan Sidney Pata (August 12, 1984 – November 7, 2006) was an American football  defensive lineman for the Miami Hurricanes and was majoring in criminology. After leaving a football practice during his fourth year at the school, Pata was murdered, a crime which would go unsolved for nearly fifteen years.

Career
Pata played three seasons at North Miami High School before moving on to Miami Central High School. He was named to Super Prep'''s All-America team, and rated as the nation's 26th-best defensive lineman by that magazine. The Atlanta Journal-Constitution'' also named him as one of the top 100 players in the South. He chose to attend the University of Miami after also considering Rutgers University, the University of Florida and the University of Oklahoma.

Pata was in his fourth year with the Hurricanes and was expected to be selected in the 2007 NFL Draft. He appeared in 41 games during his college career, making 23 starts. Pata played primarily defensive tackle in his last season, totaling 13 tackles and two sacks.  He had been placed on the watch list for the Hendricks Award, awarded to college football's top defensive end.

Death
On November 7, 2006, Pata was shot and killed outside of his apartment complex in Kendall, Florida, after leaving team practice earlier that day. The Miami-Dade police ruled the shooting to be a homicide. Pata was 22 years old. The murder remained unsolved until on August 19, 2021, former Miami football teammate Rashaun Jones was arrested and charged with the murder of Pata.

See also
List of unsolved murders
List of American football players who died during their careers

References

Further reading

External links
Miami Hurricanes profile
Official Bryan Pata Foundation website
Bryan Pata biography at CSTV.

1984 births
2006 deaths
2006 murders in the United States
North Miami Senior High School alumni
American football defensive linemen
Male murder victims
Miami Hurricanes football players
Murdered African-American people
People murdered in Florida
Deaths by firearm in Florida
Unsolved murders in the United States
Players of American football from Miami
African-American players of American football
Miami Central Senior High School alumni
20th-century African-American sportspeople
21st-century African-American sportspeople